The discography of Namie Amuro contains 12 studio albums, 7 compilation albums, 47 singles, 10 live albums, 14 video albums and 102 music videos. Amuro has also collaborated with Verbal of M-Flo and Ryōsuke Imai for her Suite Chic project.

Namie Amuro made her musical debut as the lead vocalist of Super Monkey's in 1992 under the label Toshiba EMI. In 1995 she released her first single as a solo artist, "Taiyou no Season", under the same label. That same year, she released her first studio album Dance Tracks Vol.1, which topped the Oricon weekly chart and charted for forty-four weeks and has sold over 2,000,000 copies. Only nine days after its release, Amuro released "Body Feels Exit", her first single under her new label Avex Trax.

In 1996 Amuro released her first album under Avex Trax titled Sweet 19 Blues, which reached #1 on the Oricon Album Chart with 1,921,850 copies sold in its opening week, selling over 3 million units in Japan during its original chart run.

Her 1997 single "Can You Celebrate?" sold over 2.2 million, making it Japan's best selling single by a solo female artist and was the best selling single of that year, the single followed by the highly successful album Concentration 20. Her first greatest hits album 181920 was released prior to her hiatus in 1998.

After a leave of absence, Namie returned to the music scene with the 2000 album "Genius 2000", but from then on she faced decreasing sales. Upon joining Suite Chic, Namie Amuro began transitioning from just a pop artist to also a R&B artist. This is evident with her 2003 album Style.

In 2005 she released her sixth studio album, Queen of Hip-Pop, went on the 2nd place the Oricon weekly charta, and almost doubled the sale of her previous albums. It also topped the charts in Taiwan, this album is often regarded as her comeback in the music industry.

Her seventh studio album, Play (2007) debuted at the top of the charts outselling her previous album. It and was followed by 60s 70s 80s (2008), which reached number one on the Oricon weekly and the monthly chart. On July 30, 2008, Amuro released her third greatest hits album, Best Fiction, since transitioning to R&B music. It spent six consecutive weeks at the number-one position on the Oricon weekly charts, Selling over 1,840,088  copies and was elected as "the best album of the year" at the 50th Japan Record Awards.

Albums

Studio albums

Compilation albums

Live albums

Singles

As lead artist

1990s

2000s

2010s

As featured artist

Promotional singles

Other charted songs

Other appearances

Videography

Video albums

Music video albums

Concert albums

Other video albums

Music videos

As a lead artist

As a collaborating artist

Video games

Notes

References

Discography
Discographies of Japanese artists
Contemporary R&B discographies
Pop music discographies